Aghios Nectarios was a Hansa A Type cargo ship which was built as Kalliope in 1944 by NV Koninklijk Maatschappij de Schelde, Vlissingen, Netherlands for Neptun Line, Bremen, Germany. She was seized as a prize of war in 1945, passing to the Ministry of War Transport and renamed Empire Garrison. She was sold in 1947 and was renamed Bengore Head. She was sold to Greece in 1967 and renamed Aghios Nectarios. Following a sale to Cyprus in 1971, she served until 1974, when she was scrapped.

Description

The engine was built by NV Koninklijk Maatschappij de Schelde.

History
Kalliope was a Hansa A Type cargo ship built in 1944 as yard number 249 by NV Koninklijk Maatschappij de Schelde, Vlissingen, Netherlands for Neptun Line, Bremen, Germany. She was launched in on 15 April and delivered in August. Her port of registry was Bremen.

In May 1945, Kalliope was seized as a prize of war at Kiel. The Code Letters GMRP and United Kingdom Official Number 180668 were allocated. Her port of registry was London and she was operated under the management of G Heyn & Sons Ltd.

In 1947, Empire Garrison was sold to the Ulster Steamship Co. and was renamed Bengore Head. She was operated under the management of G Heyn & Sons. With their introduction in the 1960s, Bengore Head was allocated the IMO Number 5040988.

In 1967, Bengore Head was sold to Kyrle Compagnia Naviera SA, Piraeus, Greece and was renamed Aghios Nektarios. She was operated under the management of Canopus Shipping SA. She was sold to Aldebaran Shipping Co., Famagusta, Cyprus in 1971. She served until January 1974, when she was scrapped in Spain.

References

1944 ships
Ships built by Koninklijke Maatschappij De Schelde
World War II merchant ships of Germany
Steamships of Germany
Empire ships
Ministry of War Transport ships
Merchant ships of the United Kingdom
Steamships of the United Kingdom
Cargo ships of Greece
Steamships of Greece
Merchant ships of Cyprus
Steamships of Cyprus